Cryptandra intratropica is a flowering plant in the family Rhamnaceae and is endemic to the Kimberley region of Western Australia. It is a slender, erect or spreading shrub with wedge-shaped to oblong or egg-shaped leaves and clusters of yellow to cream-coloured, tube-shaped flowers arranged in head-like clusters.

Description
The upper surface of the leaves is woolly-hairy, the lower surface shaggy-hairy, and there brown stipules at the base of each leaf. The flowers are yellow or cream-coloured and borne in head-like clusters in leaf axils, each flower on a pedicel much shorter than the sepals and with 5 or more overlapping brown bracts at the base. Flowering occurs from March to June.

Taxonomy and naming
Cryptandra intratropica was first formally described in 1918 by William Vincent Fitzgerald in the Journal and Proceedings of the Royal Society of Western Australia from specimens he collected "1,000ft. or more above the base of Mt. Broome". The specific epithet (intratropica ) means "within the Tropics".

Distribution and habitat
This cryptandra grows in a variety of sandstone habitats, mostly in near-coastal areas, mainly between the Bonaparte Archipelago and Talbot Bay in the Central Kimberley, Northern Kimberley and Victoria Bonaparte bioregions of inland Western Australia.

Conservation status
Cryptandra intratropica is listed as "not threatened" by the Government of Western Australia Department of Biodiversity, Conservation and Attractions.

References

intratropica
Rosales of Australia
Flora of Western Australia
Plants described in 1918
Taxa named by William Vincent Fitzgerald